Marcia S. Ross (born July 1955) is an American casting director and documentary producer.

Early life and education
Marcia Ross was born in Mount Vernon, New York, the daughter of Joan (née Flug) and  Richard Ross (1927–2012); her father was a New York State Assemblyman for the 88th District. She is of Jewish heritage. She attended Northwestern University, (1973-1975) as a theatre major and has a B.A. from Antioch University Los Angeles (class of 2016).

Career 
Her first professional job was as an apprentice in summer stock theatre at the Westchester Playhouse in Yonkers, NY followed by touring with a children's theatre company working as an assistant stage manager for producers Barry and Fran Weissler (1976). She then worked at Circle in the Square Theatre in NYC (1976) and the Monty Silver Talent Agency (1977). Her first casting job was at CBS Television in New York City (1979); she then relocated to Los Angeles to work with casting director, Judith Holstra - starting as her assistant, then associate, and partner in Holstra / Ross Casting (1980-1988).

Credits
Marcia Ross' producing credits include the feature-length documentaries Terrence McNally: Every Act of Life, The State Of Marriage, Father Joseph, and The Savoy King: Chick Webb and The Music That Changed America.

During her nearly 40 years as an independent casting director (Marcia Ross Casting) and casting executive for motion pictures and television, she has worked on hundreds of feature films, network series, pilots, movies for television, and mini-series. She served for 16 years as EVP for Casting for the Walt Disney Motion Pictures Group  and for 5 years as VP for Casting and Talent Development at Warner Brothers Television. She has introduced such new talent as Heath Ledger, Anne Hathaway, Chris Pine, Rachel McAdams, Paul Rudd, Brittany Murphy, Amy Poehler, Megan Fox and Jennifer Garner.  Some of her credits include Clueless, 10 Things I Hate About You, thirtysomething, The Princess Diaries, Romy and Michele's High School Reunion, The Lookout, The Hitchhiker's Guide to the Galaxy, Parental Guidance, Small Time, and Oblivion.

Her most recent film is Nasrin, which follows the life and work of the Iranian human rights lawyer Nasrin Sotoudeh, up until the time of her second arrest and imprisonment in Evin Prison in 2018.

Awards
She is the recipient of the Hoyt Bowers Award for Career Achievement in Casting by The Casting Society of America (2005), an "Outstanding Achievement in Casting" award from the Hollywood Film Festival (2002), and has multiple Artios Award nominations and wins.

Personal life 
She is married to documentary filmmaker and business partner, Jeff Kaufman. She has one daughter, Alice, and two step-children, John and Michael.

References 

1955 births
Living people
American documentary film producers
American casting directors
Women casting directors
American people of Jewish descent
People from Mount Vernon, New York
Film producers from New York (state)